Malathi Basappa (born 1950) is an Indian model and beauty queen. She was crowned Bharat Sundari 1972. She represented India at Miss World 1972 and was crowned 4th Runner Up there.

Early life and career
Malathi was born in Mysore India. A political honours graduate she was a national level basketball player Bharatnatyam dancer and model in India. She participated in Bharat Sundari 1972 contest, in those days Femina Miss India did not own the franchise for Miss World pageant. She was crowned Bharat Sundari 1972(meaning Indian Beauty 1972). She represented India at Miss World 1972 and finished as 4th Runner Up there.

References

Indian beauty pageant winners
Female models from Karnataka
1951 births
Living people
20th-century Indian women
20th-century Indian people
Miss World 1972 delegates